Alexander Taghi Tabarrok (born November 11, 1966) is a Canadian-American economist. With Tyler Cowen, he co-authors the economics blog Marginal Revolution. Tabarrok and Cowen have also ventured into online education with Marginal Revolution University.

Tabarrok is a professor at Virginia's George Mason University and Bartley J. Madden Chair in Economics at the school's Mercatus Center. In addition, Tabarrok is director of research for the Oakland, California based think tank the Independent Institute. He is the son of the late mechanical engineering professor Behrooz (Bez) Tabarrok.

His doctoral studies were done at George Mason University where he received his Ph.D. in 1994.

He has done work on dominant assurance contracts, law and economics, and health economics. He has two sons named Connor and Maxwell Tabarrok.

In 2012, journalist David Brooks called Tabarrok one of the most influential bloggers on the political right, writing that he is among those who "start from broadly libertarian premises but do not apply them in a doctrinaire way."

References

External links
 Tabarrok's GMU home page
 Tabarrok's bio at the Mercatus Center
 
 
 

1966 births
Living people
George Mason University alumni
George Mason University faculty
Canadian libertarians
Canadian people of Iranian descent
20th-century Canadian economists
21st-century Canadian economists
Mercatus Center